Wrangham may refer to:

People with the surname
Digby Cayley Wrangham (1805-1863), English barrister and politician
Francis Wrangham (1769-1842), English author and translator
Richard Wrangham (born 1948), British primatologist